Chernogolovka is a town in Moscow Oblast, Russia. Center of the town is located some 43 km (27 miles) northeast of the Moscow city limit and 59 km (37 miles) from Red Square. Its population in 2018 was 21,342.

History
Chernogolovka for the first time has been officially mentioned in 1710. In 1956, Chernogolovka grew into a scientific center with the help of Nobel Prize winner Nikolay Semyonov. Semyonov started the experimental branch of Moscow Institute of Chemical Physics, which in the 1960s–1970s grew into a scientific center. In 2001, Chernogolovka was granted town status and given the further status as a naukograd or science city in 2008.

Administrative and municipal status
Within the framework of administrative divisions, it is, together with nine rural localities, incorporated as Chernogolovka Town Under Oblast Jurisdiction—an administrative unit with the status equal to that of the districts. As a municipal division, Chernogolovka Town Under Oblast Jurisdiction is incorporated as Chernogolovka Urban Okrug.

Transportation
Chernogolovka does not have a rail link but long distance buses link the town to Moscow, Noginsk and Fryanovo.

Research facilities
Chernogolovka is a major Russian center of scientific research. It is home to a number of research institutions of the Russian Academy of Sciences:
Institute of Problems of Chemical Physics 
Institute of Solid State Physics 
Institute of Physiologically Active Compounds 
Institute of Microelectronics Technology and High Purity Materials  
Landau Institute for Theoretical Physics
Institute of Energy Problems for Chemical Physics 
Institute of Experimental Mineralogy 
Institute of Structural Macrokinetics and Materials Science 

It is also the home of Ost-Company, which produces a broad range of alcoholic and non-alcoholic drinks which are exported worldwide. Napitki iz Chernogolovki, and others.

References

Notes

Sources

External links
Official website of Chernogolovka 
Chernogolovka Business Directory 
Chernogolovka Science Center 

Cities and towns in Moscow Oblast
Naukograds
Chernogolovka Urban Okrug